Pedro Filipe Vaz Catarino (born October 20, 1990) is a Portuguese professional basketball player who plays for Sporting CP.

References

1990 births
Living people
Portuguese men's basketball players
FC Porto basketball players
Sporting CP basketball players
Point guards
Sportspeople from Porto